Oliver Mears is an English opera director.

Education
Mears read English and History at Lincoln College, Oxford, where he was awarded a Double First Class Honours Degree in English and History. He began assisting the playwright and director Howard Barker while still at university, before becoming a Trainee Assistant Director at the King's Head Theatre, London.

Second Movement
Mears founded Second Movement as joint Artistic Director with the conductor Nicholas Chalmers.  His productions for them included the UK stage premiere of Veniamin Fleishman's opera Rothschild's Violin,  Mozart and Salieri, Trouble in Tahiti, A Hand of Bridge and The Knife's Tears. The latter production toured to Prague and Brno in the Czech Republic in October 2010.

Northern Ireland Opera
In 2010 Mears was appointed as the Artistic Director of the newly created Northern Ireland Opera. His productions for them have included The Medium, Tosca, which won the Irish Times Theatre Award for Best Opera in 2012, L'elisir d'amore, Flying Dutchman (Nominated for Achievement in Opera Award, Theatre Awards UK 2013), Macbeth, Salome  and The Turn of the Screw. In August 2014 his production of The Turn of the Screw premiered at Novaya Opera Theatre, Moscow.

His production of Benjamin Britten's Noye's Fludde for Northern Ireland Opera was performed at the Beijing Music Festival in October 2012, the Chinese premiere of the piece.

He has also directed productions for the Young Vic, Aldeburgh Music, Early Opera Company, Opera North, Nederlandse Reisopera Holland, Pimlico Opera, Nevill Holt Opera and Scottish Opera, and directed Don Giovanni at Bergen National Opera in spring 2015.

In 2012, Mears was nominated for an Achievement in Opera award at the Theatre Awards UK, and in 2013, in the Best Newcomer category at the International Opera Awards.

Royal Opera
On 12 September 2016 Mears was announced as the new Director of Opera at The Royal Opera, succeeding Kasper Holten who left the post on 11 March 2017.

References

Living people
British opera directors
Alumni of Lincoln College, Oxford
Year of birth missing (living people)